The Citadel Bulldogs women's volleyball team represented The Citadel in the 2021 NCAA Division I women's volleyball season.  The Bulldogs played as members of the Southern Conference and were led by fourth year head coach Dave Zelenock.  They played their home games at McAlister Field House.

The Bulldogs finished in fifth place in the SoCon, and then swept the conference tournament to claim the SoCon championship for the first time in program history.  This also marked the first women's team conference championship for The Citadel, and their first winning season in program history.  The Bulldogs advanced to their first NCAA Tournament, where they were defeated in straight sets by eighth-seeded Georgia Tech.

Previous season
The Bulldogs finished 9–12 overall and 7–9 in the SoCon in the 2020–21 season, which was altered due to the COVID-19 pandemic.  This marked the highest winning percentage in program history, and the best conference record.

Roster

Schedule

References

The Citadel Bulldogs women's volleyball seasons
Citadel Bulldogs volleyball
Citadel